Cellulariella is a genus of fungi belonging to the family Polyporaceae. It was first documented in 2014 by Ivan V. Zmitrovich and Vera F. Malysheva. It is made up of two species: Cellulariella acuta and Cellulariella warnieri.

References 

Polyporaceae
Polyporales genera